Teleste Oyj is an international technology group that offers an integrated product and service portfolio that enables television and broadband services, secures safety in public places and supports the smooth use of public transport. Teleste is a leading international company in broadband, security and information technologies and related services. The company's customer base consists of data communications operators, train manufacturers, public transport operators, and public sector organisations.

Teleste was established in 1954 in Finland and is listed on the NASDAQ OMX Helsinki stock market since 1999.

Teleste has its own manufacturing in Littoinen and Forssa, Finland and product development units in Finland, Poland, Germany, and Belgium.

Teleste is ISO 9001, ISO 14001 and IRIS certified.

Organization
Since January 2022, the president and CEO of Teleste is Esa Harju.

Teleste has around 850 employees located in over 20 countries. The company is arranged into two business units: Networks and Video Security and Information.

Teleste Networks
Teleste Networks business unit offers broadband network and video headend solutions and technologies for telecommunications and cable operators. Its most significant customer base consists of data communications operators, but the customers can also include companies that integrate solutions into larger systems and retailers that use Teleste's products for their end-to-end deliveries. The Networks unit's main market is Europe, but it also has customer business in North America.

The Networks unit develops, designs and manufactures a large part of its products. Its product development units operate in Finland and Belgium and the in-house manufacturing activities mainly take place in Finland. The product range also includes third-party products that complement Teleste's offering.

The Networks unit also offers comprehensive services for access network design, construction and maintenance. The customer base for the unit's services mainly consists of large European cable network operators and new fibre network operators. The implementation and scope of services range from stand-alone solutions to integrated turnkey deliveries. The Networks unit's services are focused on England, Switzerland, Finland and Poland.

Video Security and Information Solutions
Teleste Video Security and Information Solutions business unit provides professional video and information management applications, systems and services for public safety authorities and operators as well as public transport operators and rolling stock manufacturers. The unit's main market is Europe, but it also operates in North America and the Middle East.

The unit develops, designs and manufactures a large part of its products. Its product development units operate in Finland, Germany and Poland, and the in-house manufacturing activities mainly take place in Finland. The product portfolio also includes third-party products that complement Teleste's range of products.

The Video Security and Information Solutions unit also provides services related to the design, deployment, system integration, upgrading and maintenance of solutions. The service customers include the unit's entire customer base.

Corporate Responsibility
In 2022, Teleste has been awarded with the silver medal in the ECOVADIS business sustainability rating. The rating evaluates and provides feedback for future development in labour and human rights, ethics, sustainable procurement and the environment. With 62/100 points, Teleste belongs in to the top 14% of the companies in its reference group.

Climate and environment
Teleste's environment work is guided by Teleste environmental policy.

The eligibility of Teleste's operations to the EU taxonomy for sustainable activities was assessed during 2021. The results show that 34% of the company's turnover and 50% of the company's capital expenditures are eligible to the taxonomy. Additionally, 52% of the company's operating expenses are related to activities that are considered environmentally sustainable.

In 2021, 78% of the energy used on Teleste premises was from renewable sources and 92% of the aluminium delivered in the company's products was recycled. The company has also achieved 36% decrease in  emission generated from air cargo compared to 2018.

Social sustainability
Teleste complies with the protection of internationally recognized human rights, such as stated in the United Nations Guiding Principles on Business and Human Rights and the International Labour Organization's Declaration on Fundamental Principles and Rights at Work.

Teleste cooperates with various educational institutions, such as Turku Vocational Institute, to provide hands-on training opportunities for students.

References

External links

Electronics companies of Finland
Companies listed on Nasdaq Helsinki
Electronics companies established in 1954
Finnish companies established in 1954